Upper Smithfield is a small community in the Canadian province of Nova Scotia, located in the Municipality of the District of Staint Mary's in Guysborough County.

References
Upper Smithfield on Destination Nova Scotia

Communities in Guysborough County, Nova Scotia
General Service Areas in Nova Scotia